The 2022 Italian Open (also known as the Rome Masters or the Internazionali BNL d'Italia for sponsorship reasons) was a professional tennis tournament played on outdoor clay courts at the Foro Italico in Rome, Italy. It was the 79th edition of the Italian Open and was classified as an ATP Tour Masters 1000 event on the 2022 ATP Tour and a non-mandatory event on the 2022 WTA Tour.

Champions

Men's singles

  Novak Djokovic def.  Stefanos Tsitsipas, 6–0, 7–6(7–5)

This was Djokovic's 87th ATP singles title, and first of the year.

Women's singles

  Iga Świątek def.  Ons Jabeur, 6–2, 6–2

This was Świątek's 8th WTA singles title, and fifth of the year.

Men's doubles

  Nikola Mektić /  Mate Pavić def.  John Isner /  Diego Schwartzman, 6–3, 6–7(6–8), [12–10]

Women's doubles

  Veronika Kudermetova /  Anastasia Pavlyuchenkova def.  Gabriela Dabrowski /  Giuliana Olmos 1–6, 6–4, [10–7]

Points and prize money

Point distribution

Prize money

*per team

References

External links
 

Italian Open
Italian Open
 
Italian Open
2020s in Rome
Italian Open (tennis)
May 2022 events in Italy
Italian Open